Tarun Bharat is a Marathi newspaper based in Belagavi, India. It is the seventh-largest-selling Marathi daily newspaper in the country. The paper has  eight editions from locations in (Belagavi) North Karnataka  Southern Maharashtra (Kolhapur, Sangli, Satara) Konkan (Sindhudurg and Ratnagiri), Mumbai  and Goa.

Baburao Thakur founded the newspaper 1919 during the British colonial era.
The Current Editor is Kiran B. Thakur and the Executive Director is Prasad K. Thakur.

Supplementary magazines
 Khazana (Wednesday)
 Mukta (Friday) a Supplement for women
 Champion (Saturday) a Supplement for Children
 Aksharyatra (Sunday)
 Gharkul (Sunday only for Belgaum edition) Supplement on property
 Diwali Magazine

See also
 List of Marathi-language newspapers
 List of newspapers in India

References

External links
 Website

Marathi-language newspapers
Publications established in 1919
1919 establishments in India
Newspapers published in Karnataka
Belgaum
Mass media in Goa